Pillavalu Gajapathy Krishnaveni (3 November 1935 – 16 August 2004), more famously known as Jikki, was an Indian playback singer from Andhra Pradesh. She sang around 10,000 songs in Telugu, Tamil, Kannada, Malayalam, Hindi, and Sinhalese languages.

Early life
Jikki was born in Chennai on 3 November 1935. Her parents Gajapathi Naidu and Rajakanthamma, a Telugu family, had moved from Chandragiri, near Tirupati in Andhra Pradesh to Chennai for their livelihood.

Her uncle, Devaraju Naidu, worked as a music composer with the celebrated Kannada theatre legend and movie pioneer Gubbi Veeranna and this introduced the young Jikki to the music and film world.

Career
Krishnaveni began her career as a child artist in 1943 and played a minor role in a Telugu movie named Panthulamma, directed by Gudavalli Ramabrahmam. In 1946, she appeared in the movie Mangalasutram, a remake of a Hollywood movie Excuse Me. She was already being noted for her musical prowess and her lilting mellifluous voice although she did not undergo any orthodox classical training in music at that stage.

A chance came her way to sing for the successful Tamil film Gnanasoundari in 1948 for which music was composed by the then doyen of film music, S. V. Venkatraman. The song was the super hit "Arul Thaarum Deva Maathaavey Aadhiyey Inba Jothi" for Kumari Rajamani who acted as the young girl growing into the young woman, M. V. Rajamma the heroine taking over the song with P. A. Periyanayaki singing as the scene advanced in time. This was the turning point in her life and changed the child actress Krishnaveni into a regular playback singer, Jikki, with offers of work for not only Tamil and Telugu films, but also for Kannada and Malayalam films.

She met her husband to be, A. M. Rajah, in 1950 when he was introduced in the Tamil film Samsaram as a new playback singer by Gemini's S. S. Vasan. He then introduced her to the Hindi film world by getting her to sing for his production Mr.Sampath in 1952. P. B. Srinivas also sang his first song in this film in a chorus. She also sang Sinhalese songs as well at that stage since the Sinhalese films were produced in Madras during those years.

Together with P. Leela, she reigned supreme in the South Indian film world in the early part of the 1950s, till P. Susheela took over the center stage from late 1950s. Though they were in competition, they were fond of each other and behaved like two sisters and sang many songs together.

Music composers she sang for

Playback singers she sang with

She sang memorable duets with all of the leading male singers, mostly with A. M. Rajah and others such as T. M. Soundararajan, Seerkazhi Govindarajan, Thiruchi Loganathan, Ghantasala, C. S. Jayaraman, P. B. Sreenivas, T. A. Mothi, S. C. Krishnan, V. N. Sundharam, A. L. Raghavan, R. B. Ramachandra, Pithapuram Nageswara Rao, M. Sathyam, M. S. Rama Rao, S. P. Balasubrahmanyam, K. J. Yesudas, Malaysia Vasudevan and Mano.

She also sang duets with female singers, most notably with P. Leela and others like P. A. Periyanayaki, M. L. Vasanthakumari, T. V. Rathnam, P. Suseela, A. P. Komala, Radha Jayalakshmi, Soolamangalam Rajalakshmi, K. Jamuna Rani, S. Janaki, A. G. Rathnamala, K. Rani , Vani Jairam and K. S. Chithra

The singing actors she sang with were M. K. Thyagaraja Bhagavathar, K. R. Ramasamy, P. Bhanumathi, S Varalaxmi and J. P. Chandrababu.

Personal life

She was married to the successful playback singer and music director A. M. Rajah. Their duets have been hits. Jikki sang many songs under her husband's direction that are still played by radio stations. A. M. Raja and Jikki have sung for live programmes in other countries such as U. S. A., Malaysia and Singapore.

A mother of six children, Jikki lost her husband when he slipped and fell between the tracks while boarding a train. The accident happened at Valliyur railway station in Tirunelveli district on 8 April 1989, when both of them were on the way to perform a concert in a temple in Kanyakumari district. After his death she stopped singing for some time. She came out of retirement and sang for Ilaiyaraja. She also started a music troupe with her two sons and performed in many countries including the United States, Malaysia and Singapore.

Personality
Once when she sang five songs for a Tamil film, she asked the producer Valampuri Somanathan to reduce her remuneration because he had given her the opportunity to sing so many songs in a single movie, such was her dedication for singing.

Death

She had been suffering from breast cancer and had surgery, but the cancer spread to her kidneys and eventually liver. Several attempts were made to save her life by her close friend and singer K. Jamuna Rani which were supported by donations through musical nights and medical and financial support from the governments of Tamil Nadu and Andhra Pradesh.

The then Tamil Nadu chief minister J.Jayalalitha and the Andhra Pradesh chief minister N. Chandrababu Naidu had granted Jikki 100,000 rupees from the Dr. MGR trust and 200,000 rupees respectively after hearing of her illness and her difficulty in meeting the treatment expenses.

She died on 16 August 2004 in Chennai.

Awards and honours
She was honoured with "Ugadi Puraskaram" by Madras Telugu Academy and Government of Tamil Nadu awarded her "Kalai Ma Mani".

Filmography

Jikki sang in 98 Telugu and 71 Tamil films.

Telugu

Tamil

Discography

References

External links
 

2004 deaths
Telugu playback singers
Indian women playback singers
Singers from Andhra Pradesh
Kannada playback singers
Tamil playback singers
1935 births
Singers from Chennai
People from Chittoor district
20th-century Indian singers
Film musicians from Andhra Pradesh
Women musicians from Andhra Pradesh
20th-century Indian women singers